Solenostomus leptosoma, the delicate ghost pipefish is a species of false pipefish from the family Solenostomidae. It is an Indo-Pacific species which occurs from the Mascarene Islands east to Japan, Indonesia and Australia. It is mainly found along the edge of reefs where the reef borders on bordering on open sand substrates. They are mainly pelagic in their early life stages until they mature and settle on the substrate to breed. The females carry the eggs in a brood pouch formed by their modified pelvic fins.

References

Fish described in 1908

Fish of the Pacific Ocean
Taxa named by Shigeho Tanaka